A list of films produced in Spain in 1980 (see 1980 in film).

1980

External links
 Spanish films of 1980 at the Internet Movie Database

1980
Spanish
Films